The January 2013 Northwest Pacific cyclone was a powerful extratropical cyclone which caused heavy rainfall and a severe blizzard in Japan in January 2013. The system then weakened, crossed the Kamchatka Peninsula late on January 18, and dissipated east of Hokkaido on January 21.

Meteorological history

At 0000 UTC on January 13, an extratropical cyclone formed northeast of Taiwan, and the Japan Meteorological Agency (JMA) started to issue storm warnings on the developing low; 18 hours later, the storm southeast of Kyushu absorbed Tropical Depression Bising which formed near the Philippines. Fed by the remnants of the tropical depression's huge amounts of heat and vapor, the storm quickly intensified and became a hurricane-force bomb cyclone when it passed over the sea south of Japan on January 14. Late the same day, the estimated 10-minute maximum sustained winds reached  when the storm was east of the Tōhoku region.

At 0000 UTC on January 16, the extratropical cyclone started to weaken, and the storm was no longer producing sustained hurricane-force winds. The storm turned westerly on January 17, and it became gale-force at 00Z on January 18. The low turned southwesterly then southerly, and it passed through the Kuril Islands on January 20. The system finally dissipated to the far east of Hokkaido on January 21.

Impact

Japan

The powerful extratropical cyclone which passed over the sea south of Japan caused heavy rainfall and snowfall in the country on January 14. In Tokyo, the blizzard dumped  of snow in nine hours.

About 1600 injuries were recorded in Japan. In Shiojiri, a 71-year-old man died after falling into an open drain as he cleared snow around his house. A large chunk of frozen snow fell from the Tokyo Skytree and crashed into the roof of a house below, leaving a  hole.

As January 14 was also Coming of Age Day in 2013, many young Japanese people who were celebrating their 20th year had to walk through heavy snowfall to attend Coming of Age Day ceremonies.

See also

Explosive cyclogenesis
Great Gale of 1880
Columbus Day Storm of 1962
November 2011 Bering Sea superstorm
Tropical Depression Bising
2013 Pacific typhoon season
Typhoon Nuri (2014)
November 2014 Bering Sea cyclone

References

External links
WIS Portal – GISC Tokyo

2013 Northwest
Climate of Japan
2013 in Japan
2013 meteorology
2013 natural disasters
Weather events in Asia
Weather events in Oceania
2013 in Oceania
2013 in Asia